Yellowknife Curling Centre is a curling club in Yellowknife, Northwest Territories, Canada. In 2014 the club hosted the 2014 Canadian Senior Curling Championships.

The club used to be known as the Yellowknife Curling Club. 

It has eight sheets.

References

Curling clubs in Canada
Sport in Yellowknife
Curling in the Northwest Territories
Sports venues in the Northwest Territories